Frederick Currie may refer to:
Sir Frederick Currie, 1st Baronet (1799–1875), English diplomat
Sir Frederick Currie, 2nd Baronet (1823–1900)
Frederick Currie (cricketer), English cricketer and British Army officer

See also
Fred Curry (disambiguation)
Frederick Currey, English rugby union player
Currie baronets
Currie (surname)